The 2019 Southeastern Louisiana Lions baseball team represented Southeastern Louisiana University in the 2019 NCAA Division I baseball season. The Lions played their home games at Pat Kenelly Diamond at Alumni Field.

Roster

Coaching staff

Schedule

! style="" | Regular Season
|- valign="top" 

|- bgcolor="#ffcccc"
| 1 || February 15 || Louisiana Tech || Pat Kenelly Diamond at Alumni Field • Hammond, LA || L 8–13 || 0–1 ||
|- bgcolor="#ffcccc"
| 2 || February 16 || Louisiana Tech || Pat Kenelly Diamond at Alumni Field • Hammond, LA || L 11–15 || 0–2 ||
|- bgcolor="#ffcccc"
| 3 || February 17 || Louisiana Tech || Pat Kenelly Diamond at Alumni Field • Hammond, LA || L 8-12 || 0–3 || 
|- bgcolor="#ffcccc"
| 4 || February 19 || at #1 LSU || Alex Box Stadium, Skip Bertman Field • Baton Rouge, LA || L 5–6 || 0–4 ||
|- bgcolor="#ccffcc"
| 5 || February 22 || Stony Brook || Pat Kenelly Diamond at Alumni Field • Hammond, LA || W 7–2 || 1–4 ||
|- bgcolor="#ffcccc"
| 6 || February 23 || Stony Brook || Pat Kenelly Diamond at Alumni Field • Hammond, LA || L 4–7 || 1–5 ||
|- bgcolor="#ccffcc"
| 7 || February 24 || Stony Brook || Pat Kenelly Diamond at Alumni Field • Hammond, LA || W 8–0 || 2–5 ||
|- bgcolor="#ffcccc"
| 8 || February 27 || at #9 Mississippi State || Dudy Noble Field, Polk–DeMent Stadium • Starkville, MS || L 0–12 || 2–6 ||
|-

|- bgcolor="#ffcccc"
| 9 || March 1 || at Troy || Riddle–Pace Field • Troy, AL || L 2–5 || 2–7 ||
|- bgcolor="#ffcccc"
| 10 || March 2 || at Troy || Riddle-Pace Field • Troy, AL || L 3–8 || 2–8 ||
|- bgcolor="#ccffcc"
| 11 || March 2 || at Troy || Riddle-Pace Field • Troy, AL || W 19–4 || 3–8 ||
|- bgcolor="#ccffcc"
| 12 || March 5 || Louisiana-Monroe || Pat Kenelly Diamond at Alumni Field • Hammond, LA || W 10–3 || 4–8 ||
|- bgcolor="#ccffcc"
| 13 || March 6 || Louisiana-Monroe || Pat Kenelly Diamond at Alumni Field • Hammond, LA || W 7–1 || 5–8 ||
|- bgcolor="#ffcccc"
| 14 || March 8 || Central Arkansas || Pat Kenelly Diamond at Alumni Field • Hammond, LA || L 1–3 || 5–9 || 0–1
|- bgcolor="#ffcccc"
| 15 || March 9 || Central Arkansas || Pat Kenelly Diamond at Alumni Field • Hammond, LA || L 2–3 || 5–10 || 0–2
|- bgcolor="#ccffcc"
| 16 || March 10 || Central Arkansas || Pat Kenelly Diamond at Alumni Field • Hammond, LA || W 3-2 || 6–10 || 1-2
|- bgcolor="#ffcccc"
| 17 || March 15 || at Oklahoma State || Allie P. Reynolds Stadium • Stillwater, OK || L 0-9 || 6–11 ||
|- bgcolor="#ffcccc"
| 18 || March 16 || at Oklahoma State || Allie P. Reynolds Stadium • Stillwater, OK || L 1-5 || 6–12 ||
|- bgcolor="#ccffcc"
| 19 || March 17 || at Oklahoma State || Allie P. Reynolds Stadium • Stillwater, OK || W 5-3 || 7–12 ||
|- bgcolor="#ccffcc"
| 20 || March 20 || Alcorn State || Pat Kenelly Diamond at Alumni Field • Hammond, LA || W 13-3 || 8–12 ||
|- bgcolor="#ccffcc"
| 21 || March 22 || Abilene Christian || Pat Kenelly Diamond at Alumni Field • Hammond, LA || W 14–1 || 9–12 || 2–2
|- align="center" bgcolor="#ccffcc
| 22 || March 23 || Abilene Christian || Pat Kenelly Diamond at Alumni Field • Hammond, LA || W 12–9 || 10–12 || 3–2
|- bgcolor="#ccffcc"
| 23 || March 24 || Abilene Christian || Pat Kenelly Diamond at Alumni Field • Hammond, LA || W 8–3 || 11–12 || 4–2
|- bgcolor="#ccffcc"
| 24 || March 26 || at South Alabama || Eddie Stanky Field • Mobile, AL || W 1–0 || 12–12 ||
|- bgcolor="#ccffcc"
| 25 || March 29 || at Stephen F. Austin || Jaycees Field • Nacogdoches, TX || W 5–1 || 13–12 || 5–2
|- bgcolor="#ccffcc"
| 26 || March 30 || at Stephen F. Austin || Jaycees Field • Nacogdoches, TX || W 11–3 || 14–12 || 6–2
|- bgcolor="#ffcccc"
| 27 || March 31 || at Stephen F. Austin || Jaycees Field • Nacogdoches, TX || L 2–4 || 14–13 || 6–3
|-

|- bgcolor="#ffcccc"
| 28 || April 2 || at Louisiana || M. L. Tigue Moore Field at Russo Park • Lafayette, LA || L 2–8 || 14–14 ||
|- bgcolor="#ffcccc"
| 29 || April 3 || Louisiana || Pat Kenelly Diamond at Alumni Field • Hammond, LA || L 8-9 || 14–15 ||
|- bgcolor="#ccffcc"
| 30 || April 5 || at New Orleans (Pontchartrain Bowl) || Maestri Field at Privateer Park • New Orleans, LA || W 7–1 || 15–15 || 7–3
|- bgcolor="#ccffcc"
| 31 || April 6 || at New Orleans (Pontchartrain Bowl) || Maestri Field at Privateer Park • New Orleans, LA || W 7–6 || 16–15 || 8–3
|- bgcolor="#ffcccc"
| 32 || April 6 || at New Orleans (Pontchartrain Bowl) || Maestri Field at Privateer Park • New Orleans, LA || L 4–7 || 16–16 || 8–4
|- bgcolor="#ffcccc"
| 33 || April 9 || Tulane || Pat Kenelly Diamond at Alumni Field • Hammond, LA || L 14–15 || 16–17 ||
|- bgcolor="#ccffcc"
| 34 || April 12 || Northwestern State || Pat Kenelly Diamond at Alumni Field • Hammond, LA || W 5–3 || 17–17 || 9–4
|- bgcolor="#ccffcc"
| 35 || April 13 || Northwestern State || Pat Kenelly Diamond at Alumni Field • Hammond, LA || W 8–1 || 18–17 || 10–4
|- bgcolor="#ffcccc"
| 36 || April 14 || Northwestern State || Pat Kenelly Diamond at Alumni Field • Hammond, LA || L 1–3 || 18–18 || 10–5
|- bgcolor="#ccffcc"
| 37 || April 16 || at McNeese State || Joe Miller Ballpark • Lake Charles, LA || W 12–3 || 19–18 ||
|- bgcolor="#ccffcc"
| 38 || April 19 || Nicholls || Pat Kenelly Diamond at Alumni Field • Hammond, LA || W 3-1 || 20–18 || 11–5
|- bgcolor="#ffcccc"
| 39 || April 19 || Nicholls || Pat Kenelly Diamond at Alumni Field • Hammond, LA || L: 1–4 || 20–19 || 11–6
|- bgcolor="#ccffcc"
| 40 || April 20 || at Nicholls || Ben E. Meyer Diamond at Ray E. Didier Field • Thibodaux, LA || W 11–1 || 21–19 || 12-6
|- bgcolor="#ccffcc"
| 41 || April 23 || at Tulane || Greer Field at Turchin Stadium • New Orleans, LA || W 10–3 || 22–19 || 
|- bgcolor="#ccffcc"
| 42 || April 26 || at Texas A&M-Corpus Christi || Chapman Field • Corpus Christi, TX || W 3–0 || 23–19 || 13-6
|- bgcolor="#ccffcc"
| 43 || April 27 || at Texas A&M-Corpus Christi || Chapman Field • Corpus Christi, TX || W 12–2 || 24–19 || 14–6
|- bgcolor="#ffcccc"
| 44 || April 28 || at Texas A&M-Corpus Christi || Chapman Field • Corpus Christi, TX || L 3–5 || 24–20 || 14–7
|-

|- bgcolor="#ccffcc"
| 45 || May 1 || McNeese State || Pat Kenelly Diamond at Alumni Field • Hammond, LA || W 4–3 || 25–20 ||
|- bgcolor="#ccffcc"
| 46 || May 3 || at Lamar || Vincent–Beck Stadium • Beaumont, TX || W 4-3 || 26–20 || 15–7
|- bgcolor="#ffcccc"
| 47 || May 4 || at Lamar || Vincent-Beck Stadium • Beaumont, TX || L 9–13 || 26–21 || 15–8
|- bgcolor="#ccffcc"
| 48 || May 5 || at Lamar || Vincent-Beck Stadium • Beaumont, TX || W 6–4 || 27–21 || 16–8
|- bgcolor="#ffcccc"
| 49 || May 7 || South Alabama || Pat Kenelly Diamond at Alumni Field • Hammond, LA || L 4–14 || 27–22 ||
|- bgcolor="#ccffcc"
| 50 || May 10 || Sam Houston State || Pat Kenelly Diamond at Alumni Field • Hammond, LA || W 3–0 || 28–22 || 17–8
|- bgcolor="#ffcccc"
| 51 || May 12 || Sam Houston State || Pat Kenelly Diamond at Alumni Field • Hammond, LA || L 7-11 || 28-23 || 17-9
|- bgcolor="#ffcccc"
| 52 || May 12 || Sam Houston State || Pat Kenelly Diamond at Alumni Field • Hammond, LA || L 5–14 || 28–24 || 17–10
|- bgcolor="#ccffcc"
| 53 || May 16 || at Incarnate Word || Sullivan Field • San Antonio, TX || W 8–6 || 29–24 || 18–10
|- bgcolor="#ccffcc"
| 54 || May 17 || at Incarnate Word || Sullivan Field • San Antonio, TX || W 5–3 || 30–24 || 19–10
|- bgcolor="#ffcccc"
| 55 || May 17 || at Incarnate Word || Sullivan Field • San Antonio, TX || L 2–7 || 30–25 || 19–11
|-

|-
! style="" | Post-Season
|- valign="top" 

|- bgcolor="#ffcccc"
| 56 || May 22 || vs. Stephen F. Austin || Constellation Field • Sugar Land, TX || L 0–5 || 30–26 ||
|- bgcolor="#ccffcc"
| 57 || May 23 || vs. Northwestern State || Constellation Field • Sugar Land, TX || W 6-4 || 31-26 ||
|- bgcolor="#ccffcc"
| 58 || May 24 || vs. Stephen F. Austin || Constellation Field • Sugar Land, TX || W 4-3 || 32-26 ||
|- bgcolor="#ccffcc"
| 59 || May 24 || vs. Central Arkansas || Constellation Field • Sugar Land, TX || W 9-3 || 33-26 ||
|- bgcolor="#ffcccc"
| 60 || May 25 || vs. Central Arkansas || Constellation Field • Sugar Land, TX || L 3-6 || 33-27 ||
|-

|-
|

References

Southeastern Louisiana Lions
Southeastern Louisiana Lions baseball seasons
Southeastern Louisiana baseball